Beòlach is a Canadian instrumental folk music group from Cape Breton Island, Nova Scotia. They are most noted for their 2020 album All Hands, which was a Juno Award nominee for Traditional Folk Album of the Year at the Juno Awards of 2021 and won two Canadian Folk Music Awards for Traditional Album of the Year and Instrumental Group of the Year at the 16th Canadian Folk Music Awards.

Formed in 1998 by fiddlers Wendy MacIsaac and Màiri Rankin, pianist Mac Morin, guitarist Patrick Gillis and piper Ryan MacNeil to play a set at the Celtic Colours festival, they released the albums Beòlach in 2001 and Variations in 2004, and toured extensively to support the albums, but then went on hiatus as the band members pursued other projects. They began performing as a group again in the late 2010s. Matt MacIsaac replaced Ryan MacNeil on pipes at this time; while Gillis has also not rejoined the band as a full-time member, he performed some guitar parts as a session musician on All Hands.

In addition to their Juno and CFMA nominations, the group received four East Coast Music Award nominations in 2021, for best instrumental album, roots traditional album, group recording and fans choice entertainer of the year.

References

External links

Canadian folk music groups
Canadian instrumental musical groups
Musical groups from Nova Scotia
Musical groups established in 1998
Canadian Folk Music Award winners